13th Cavalry Brigade may refer to:

 13th Cavalry Brigade (British Indian Army) of the British Indian Army in the First World War, distinct from the one below
 13th Indian Cavalry Brigade of the British Indian Army in the First World War, distinct from the one above

See also
 13th Brigade (disambiguation)